Vrt (in older sources also Vrd) is a small settlement on the left bank of the Kolpa River in the Municipality of Kočevje in southern Slovenia. It has two permanent inhabitants. The area is part of the traditional region of Lower Carniola and is now included in the Southeast Slovenia Statistical Region.

References

External links

Vrt on Geopedia

Populated places in the Municipality of Kočevje